Barishah-e Khuybar (also Romanized as Barīshāh-e Khūybār; also known as Barāvand-e Barīshāh) is a village in Qalkhani Rural District, Gahvareh District, Dalahu County, Kermanshah Province, Iran. At the 2006 census, its population was 295, in 59 families.

References 

Populated places in Dalahu County